Sandy Creek is a stream in Jefferson County in the U.S. state of Missouri. It is a tributary of Joachim Creek.

Sandy Creek was named for the sandy character of the creek bed.

See also
List of rivers of Missouri

References

Rivers of Jefferson County, Missouri
Rivers of Missouri